Jeffrey Brian Nelson (born June 1, 1965) is an American professional baseball umpire in Major League Baseball (MLB), who was named to the National League (NL) staff prior to the 1999 season, and has worked throughout both major leagues since 2000.

A graduate of Bethel University in St. Paul, Minnesota, he wears uniform number 45. Nelson was promoted to crew chief starting with the 2014 season.

Umpiring career
Nelson was named as the Top Prospect at the Joe Brinkman Umpiring School in 1989.

He was promoted to the National League prior to the 1999 season along with Paul Nauert to fill vacancies left by the retirements of Jim Quick and Harry Wendelstedt.

While in the minor leagues, Nelson was the chief rules instructor at the former Brinkman-Froemming umpire school in Cocoa, Florida from 1997 until the school's closing in 1998. He continues to teach at umpire clinics in the off-season. Additionally, Nelson is currently the secretary/treasurer of the major league umpires' union, the Major League Baseball Umpires Association.

During his career, Nelson has received several postseason assignments, including the 2005 World Series, 2009 World Series, 2014 World Series and the 2018 World Series. He also worked the League Championship Series in 2002, 2004, 2010, 2011, 2012, 2015, 2016, 2019 and 2020; and the Division Series in 2000, 2001, 2005, 2008, 2009, 2014, 2017 and 2018. Nelson has also umpired in the 2006 and 2014 MLB All-Star Games.

Nelson was behind home plate when Mark McGwire hit his 500th home run, and worked the game in which Rickey Henderson made his 3,000th hit.

Nelson served as the second base umpire when Chicago Cubs pitcher Carlos Zambrano threw a no-hitter against the Houston Astros at Miller Park on September 14, 2008.

Nelson was the plate umpire for a Detroit Tigers–Kansas City Royals game on September 27, 2012, when Tigers pitcher Doug Fister set an American League record by striking out nine consecutive batters.

During Game 2 of the 2012 American League Championship Series, Nelson ejected New York Yankees manager Joe Girardi for arguing a missed call at second base after Nelson incorrectly ruled Detroit Tigers infielder Omar Infante was safe. He later acknowledged his safe call was wrong.

Nelson was chosen as one of the umpires for the one-game Wild Card playoff between the Atlanta Braves and the St. Louis Cardinals on October 5, 2012.

Nelson worked home plate for Game 7 of the 2014 World Series between the San Francisco Giants and the Kansas City Royals at Kauffman Stadium in Kansas City.

Nelson was the plate umpire for the Baltimore Orioles-Seattle Mariners game on August 12, 2015, when Mariners pitcher Hisashi Iwakuma threw a no-hitter.

Nelson was the home plate umpire for the 2015 National League Wild Card Game between the Chicago Cubs and Pittsburgh Pirates.

While working home plate during Game 3 of the 2019 American League Championship Series, Nelson took two foul balls off his mask and was forced to leave the game after the fourth inning due to suffering a concussion. He would miss the remainder of the series and was replaced by Mike Everitt.

See also 

 List of Major League Baseball umpires

References

External links
Major League profile
Photo, arguing with Reds manager Bob Boone
Retrosheet

1965 births
Living people
Major League Baseball umpires
Sportspeople from Saint Paul, Minnesota
People from Cottage Grove, Minnesota
Bethel University (Minnesota) alumni